A list of films produced in Spain in 1981 (see 1981 in film).

1981

External links
 Spanish films of 1981 at the Internet Movie Database

1981
Spanish
Films